Spillum is a village in the municipality of Namsos in Trøndelag county, Norway. The Norwegian Sawmill Museum is located in the village of Spillum.

References

External links
The Norwegian Sawmill Museum

Villages in Trøndelag
Namsos